Walter Delle Karth Sr. (12 August 1911 – 2004) was an Austrian skier. He competed in the Nordic combined event at the 1936 Winter Olympics.

References

External links
 

1911 births
2004 deaths
Austrian male Nordic combined skiers
Olympic Nordic combined skiers of Austria
Nordic combined skiers at the 1936 Winter Olympics
Place of birth missing